William Jones House may refer to:

William C. Jones House, Eutaw, Alabama
William R. Jones House, Cambridge, Massachusetts
Colonel William Jones House, Gentryville, Indiana
William Cuthbert Jones House, St. Louis, Missouri, listed on the NRHP in St. Louis, Missouri

See also
Jones House (disambiguation)